Le Château hanté, released in the United States as The Devil's Castle and in Britain as The Haunted Castle, is an 1897 French short silent film directed by Georges Méliès. It is a remake of a previous film by Méliès, The House of the Devil (Le Manoir du diable, 1896). The 1896 original, which was released in the United States as The Haunted Castle and in Britain as The Devil's Castle, is sometimes confused for the 1897 version.

Le Château hanté is about a man who enters a haunted castle and is constantly taunted by spirits within.

Plot
Two men enter a room in a castle; one offers a chair to the other and then exits. The remaining man attempts to sit down, but the chair moves away from him, and he falls to the ground. When the man approaches the chair, it turns into a ghost, then a skeleton, and then an armored knight; then it disappears completely. Turning, the man finds himself confronted by Satan. He attempts to escape, but a ghost blocks his way.

Production and release
The film marks the second appearance of Satan as a character in a Méliès film (the first was Le Manoir du diable the previous year). The special effects in the film were created using the editing technique known as the substitution splice. One moment in the film, the transformation of the ghostly figure into a knight in armor, prefigures numerous sight gags involving armor that became popular during the silent era in comedy films.

Le Château hanté was released by Méliès's Star Film Company and is numbered 96 in its catalogues. The English film pioneer George Albert Smith, a corresponding friend and colleague of Méliès, was among the buyers of the film; Smith himself experimented extensively with similarly ghostly topics in his own films made around the same time. Smith is sometimes credited with a lost 1897 film of his own on the same subject, and also called The Haunted Castle, but this title may simply be the Méliès film, mistakenly attributed to Smith by later film scholars.

The film was the first Méliès work to be hand-colored at the coloring lab run by Elisabeth Thuillier. A hand-colored print of Le Château hanté survives; its straightforward color scheme uses a red tone to help the characters stand out from the painted backdrop (although the tones also help distract the eye from the editing tricks used). Méliès went on to have Thuillier and her lab workers hand-color many of his films; later collaborations between Méliès and Thuillier were much more elaborate in their use of color.

See also
 List of ghost films

References

External links
 
 

1897 films
French silent short films
French black-and-white films
Films directed by Georges Méliès
Films set in castles
1890s ghost films
French haunted house films
Horror film remakes
Articles containing video clips
French ghost films
1897 short films
Silent horror films
1890s French films